Luk Tei Tong is a village of Mui Wo, on Lantau Island, Hong Kong.

Administration
Luk Tei Tong is a recognized village under the New Territories Small House Policy.

History
At the time of the 1911 census, the population of Luk Tei Tong was 76. The number of males was 23.

Features
Luk Tei Tong is known for the Luk Tei Tong watchtower, which is listed as a Grade 3 Historic Building. It is said to have been built for protection against bandits and its date of construction has been stated as roughly 1930 or roughly 1942.

References

External links

 Delineation of area of existing village Luk Tei Tong (Mui Wo) for election of resident representative (2019 to 2022)

Villages in Islands District, Hong Kong
Mui Wo